Randy Radames Ruiz (born October 19, 1977) is an American former professional baseball designated hitter and first baseman. He stands 6'1" and weighs 240 pounds. Born in The Bronx, New York to parents from Santurce, Puerto Rico, he attended James Monroe High School, and played baseball under coach Mike Turo. He then attended Bellevue University in Bellevue, Nebraska, where he played college level baseball. Ruiz was drafted in round 36 of the 1996 draft.

In Minor League Baseball, he played in the Cincinnati Reds, Baltimore Orioles, Philadelphia Phillies (twice), New York Yankees, Kansas City Royals, Pittsburgh Pirates, and San Francisco Giants organizations. Ruiz holds the record for the longest hitting streak by a Rochester Red Wing player since  with 24 consecutive games. He also won the Rookie of the Year Award in the International League at 30 years old. He was then called up to play Major League Baseball with the Minnesota Twins, and was later a free agent after the  baseball season. During the offseason, he plays for the Indios de Mayagüez in the Puerto Rico Baseball League.

Career

Cincinnati Reds
Ruiz spent nine baseball seasons with seven different franchises in Minor League Baseball. On July 11, he was signed to the Cincinnati Reds organization as a non-drafted free agent. He made his professional debut playing in 33 games for the Gulf Coast Reds and two games for Single-A Clinton LumberKings.

In , Ruiz won the Pioneer League batting title with the Billings Mustangs, and was named to the league's post-season All-Star squad. He ranked fourth in hits with 88 hits, and fifth in slugging percentage with a .584 mark.

In , Ruiz tied for third in the league in extra base hits with 57, fourth in runs batted in (RBI) with 92, and fifth in doubles with 34. The Cincinnati Reds released him during spring training and he signed with the Baltimore Orioles organization as a free agent on March 29 of that season.

In , Ruiz won the Eastern League batting title while playing with the Reading Phillies in the Philadelphia Phillies organization. During that season, he had two violations of the MLB substance abuse policy, of the minor league drug prevention, and treatment program, which lowered the chances of him reaching the major leagues. He had to serve two suspensions, testing positive for an anabolic steroid, Stanozolol. Ruiz denied he ever used the drug, and instead alleged his positive tests were the result of his use of Sildenafil. Failing the first drug test, he served a 15-day suspension. Failing a second drug test, Ruiz had to serve a 30-day suspension under the guidelines of the substance abuse policy again. He made an appeal about the drug test, but it was denied. Due to Ruiz being suspended from playing baseball, the Reading Phillies' received Nate Grindell from Triple-A Scranton/Wilkes Barre Red Barons roster to replace him until his suspension expired.

Kansas City Royals
In , Ruiz signed in  the Kansas City Royals organization as a minor league free agent.

Minnesota Twins 
On November 16, 2007, Ruiz was signed by the Minnesota Twins as a minor league free agent. He began the  season with the Rochester Red Wings, the Twins' Triple-A affiliate. From June 22 – July 19 of that season, Ruiz had hits in 24 consecutive games, the longest hitting streak by a Rochester Red Wing player since 1979, when the team began keeping daily statistics for individual players. The Twins recognized Ruiz as the organization's Minor League Player of the Month of June. He had a batting average of .441, with three home runs and 12 RBI during his last ten games with the Red Wings, before being called up by the Twins to play in the major leagues. His season-long totals with Rochester were: 111 games played, .320 batting average, 33 doubles, 17 homers, and 68 RBIs.

Ruiz's contract was purchased by the Minnesota Twins on August 1, along with Francisco Liriano being called up from Triple-A. Liriano and Ruiz were eating together at a restaurant when they heard about the call-up. The Twins designated them to replace right-handed pitcher Liván Hernández and outfielder Craig Monroe, making them free agents. That night, he made his major league debut for the Twins at age 30 as the designated hitter. The Cleveland Indians were playing against the Twins at Hubert H. Humphrey Metrodome with 33,709 people attending the game. Ruiz had three plate appearances, getting his first major league hit on his third at bat off of a pitch by starting pitcher Jeremy Sowers in the seventh inning. He also hit his first major league home run on August 27, 2008, off of Seattle Mariners' pitcher, Ryan Rowland-Smith, only hours after he was named the International League Rookie of the Year. "Feels great, but I'm really down right now because we lost," Ruiz said. "We had a runner at second there and no outs. I should have been up there moving him over."

Ruiz was released by the Twins on December 3, 2008.

Toronto Blue Jays 
Ruiz signed with the Toronto Blue Jays on December 17.
He began the season playing with the Las Vegas 51s in the Pacific Coast League, where he was selected to play in the 2009 Triple-A All-Star Game. Through 114 games with Las Vegas,  Ruiz was having one of the best offensive seasons of any player in the PCL, with a .320 batting average, 81 runs scored, 43 doubles, 25 homers, 106 runs batted in, 270 total bases, a .392 on-base percentage, and a .584 slugging average. His marks in doubles, RBIs, and total bases led the league, when he was called up to Toronto on Aug. 11. On Sep 6, Ruiz was selected as MVP of the PCL.

Ruiz was called up to the Blue Jays major league roster on August 11, replacing Alex Ríos, who was claimed on waivers by the Chicago White Sox. Toronto was in New York at the time, to face the New York Yankees at the new Yankee Stadium, only a few blocks from where Ruiz had grown up. After striking out in his first at bat, Randy hit his first home run of 2009 with the Toronto Blue Jays. Ruiz duplicated the feat the next day, homering in the second inning off ex-Jay A. J. Burnett. On September 6, 2009, in a game against the New York Yankees, former Blue Jay Josh Towers threw a ball up and in, that ran into Ruiz, and hit him in the face. He walked off on his own power, receiving a standing ovation and waving to the crowd. Randy Ruiz finished the 2009 season (in which he played only 33 games) with 10 HR, 17 RBI, and a batting average of .313.

Ruiz entered 2010 Spring Training within Major League Baseball with the Toronto Blue Jays and started strong.  Entering opening day, Ruiz was actively listed on the 25-man roster. However, as the season continued, he saw less and less at bats.  In May 2010, Ruiz had asked for his release from the Blue Jay organization due to a larger contract offering.

Tohoku Rakuten Eagles
He was granted his release on May 19, 2010, subsequently signing a contract with the Tohoku Rakuten Golden Eagles of the Nippon Professional Baseball (NPB) where he was on the active roster.

On November 29, 2011, he became free agent.

Yokohama BayStars

Ruiz played season in 2012 Yokohama DeNA BayStars for an estimated ¥15 million contract.

Chicago White Sox

On January 12, 2013, Ruiz signed a minor league contract with the Chicago White Sox.

New York Yankees
On June 17, 2013, Ruiz signed a Minor League contract with the New York Yankees and was assigned to their Triple-A affiliate Scranton/Wilkes-Barre RailRiders. In 71 games for the Yankees Triple-A affiliate, Ruiz posted a .274 batting average and hit 17 home runs.

References

External links

1977 births
Living people
African-American baseball players
Águilas del Zulia players
American expatriate baseball players in Venezuela
Altoona Curve players
American expatriate baseball players in Canada
American expatriate baseball players in Japan
American expatriate baseball players in Mexico
American sportspeople in doping cases
American sportspeople of Puerto Rican descent
Baseball coaches from New York (state)
Baseball players suspended for drug offenses
Bellevue Bruins baseball players
Bellevue University alumni
Billings Mustangs players
Broncos de Reynosa players
Clinton LumberKings players
Connecticut Defenders players
Dayton Dragons players
Delmarva Shorebirds players
Frederick Keys players
Gulf Coast Reds players
Indios de Mayagüez players
James Monroe High School (New York City) alumni
Lakewood BlueClaws players
Las Vegas 51s players
Long Island Ducks players
Major League Baseball first basemen
Minnesota Twins players
Mexican League baseball first basemen
Nippon Professional Baseball first basemen
Ottawa Lynx players
Pacific Coast League MVP award winners
Reading Phillies players
Reno Aces players
Rochester Red Wings players
Rojos del Águila de Veracruz players
Scranton/Wilkes-Barre RailRiders players
Baseball players from New York City
Stockton Ports players
Tohoku Rakuten Golden Eagles players
Toronto Blue Jays players
Toros de Tijuana players
Trenton Thunder players
Wichita Wranglers players
Yokohama DeNA BayStars players
Criollos de Caguas players
21st-century African-American sportspeople
20th-century African-American sportspeople